Walter Henry Moeller (March 15, 1910 – April 13, 1999) was an American politician from the Democratic Party. He served Ohio's 10th congressional district in the House of Representatives, during the 86th, 87th, and 89th Congresses.

Biography 
Moeller was born on March 15, 1910, in New Palestine, Indiana. He entered a Lutheran seminary in 1935 and served as a pastor in the 1940s and after his retirement from politics.

Political career
Moeller became active in Ohio politics in the 1950s, serving in the United States House of Representatives from 1959 to 1963 and from 1965 to 1967. He acted as an assistant to the education director of NASA and was a member of Kiwanis.

Death
Moeller died in Santa Barbara, California, on April 13, 1999, age 89, after doing pastoral work in the state.

See also
 Ohio's 10th congressional district#Recent election results
 List of United States representatives from Ohio

External links
Congressional bioguide

American Lutherans
People from New Palestine, Indiana
People from Santa Barbara, California
1910 births
1999 deaths
20th-century American politicians
20th-century Lutherans
Democratic Party members of the United States House of Representatives from Ohio